Dinosaurs (The Most Complete, Up-to-Date Encyclopedia for Dinosaur Lovers of All Ages) is a book by Dr. Thomas R. Holtz, Jr., with illustrations by Luis Rey. It was published in 2007 by Random House. The book received generally positive reviews upon release and garnered the nickname "The Dinosaur Bible". Dr Holtz setup a companion website, which shares updates on new dinosaur discoveries.

References

External links
 Supplementary Information to Dinosaurs: The Most Complete, Up-to-Date Encyclopedia for Dinosaur Lovers of All Ages by Thomas R. Holtz, Jr., illustrations by Luis Rey
 Review in School Library Journal, November 21, 2007
 Review in Science News, January 12, 2008
 Listing in "Outstanding Science Trade Books for Students K–12: 2008 (Books published in 2007)" , National Science Teachers Association
 Parent's Choice Recommendation for Non-Fiction 2008 
 Listing in "Science Books for Fun and Learning — Some Recommendations from 2008" in Science magazine

2007 non-fiction books
Dinosaur books
Encyclopedias of science
Paleontology books